Musica enchiriadis is an anonymous musical treatise of the 9th century. It is the first surviving attempt to set up a system of rules for polyphony in western art music. The treatise was once attributed to Hucbald, but this is no longer accepted.  Some historians once attributed it to Odo of Cluny (879-942). It has also been attributed to Abbot Hoger (d. 906).

This music theory treatise, along with its companion text, Scolica enchiriadis, was widely circulated in medieval  manuscripts, often in association with Boethius' De institutione musica. It consists of nineteen chapters; the first nine are devoted to notation, modes, and monophonic plainchant.

Chapters 10-18 deal with polyphonic music. The author here shows how consonant intervals should be used to compose or improvise the type of early-medieval polyphonic music called  organum, an early style of note-against-note polyphony several examples of which are included in the treatise. (Scolica enchiriadis also observes that some melodies should be sung "more quickly" (celerius), others "more slowly" (morosius).) The last, nineteenth, chapter of Musica enchiriadis relates the legend of Orpheus.

The scale used in the work, which is based on a system of tetrachords, appears to have been created solely for use in the work itself, rather than taken from actual musical practice. The treatise also uses a very rare system of notation, known as Daseian notation. This notation has a number of figures which are rotated ninety degrees to represent different pitches.

A critical edition of the treatises was published in 1981, and an English translation by Raymond Erickson in 1995.

See also 
Daseian notation
Tonary

References

External links

 Link to colour images of the MS of the text (V-CVbav pal. lat. 1342) available via the University of Heidelberg's site.
 Link to colour images of the MS of the text (D-Msb Clm 14372) available via the Bavarian State Library.

9th-century books
Music theory
Musical scales
Polyphonic form
Medieval music manuscript sources